Sir Donal O'Donnell (Irish: Sir Domhnall Ó Domhnaill, died 1590) was a member of the O'Donnell dynasty of Tyrconnell in modern-day County Donegal. He was the eldest son of Sir Hugh McManus O'Donnell, the Lord of Tyrconnell for much of the reign of Elizabeth I.

Biography
Sir Donal O'Donnell was the eldest son of Sir Hugh O'Donnell, the ruler of Tyrconnell. Sir Donal was the leading contender in the O'Donnell succession dispute of the 1580s which took place while his father was still alive. His personal jurisdiction covered "that part of Tirconnell from the mountain westwards, i.e. from Barnesmore to the river Drowes (i.e. Tirhugh), and also all the inhabitants of Boylagh and Tir Boghaine (i.e. Bannagh)". His father's primary domain concentrated on Kilmacrenan and Mongavlin, and his cousin Niall Garbh O'Donnell held sway in Lifford and eastwards of there. The Four Masters described him as "a mighty champion and great in battle, and it was never heard that at any time he had turned his back on his enemies" and O'Donovan says he was known "to lead his father's forces".

Amongst the other leading contenders were his younger half-brother Hugh Roe O'Donnell and his great-uncle Hugh Dubh O'Donnell. Donal received the allegiance of O'Boyle and MacSweeney Banagh, as well as of the English Crown, who felt he had a stronger claim to the Lordship, by primogeniture. The Dublin government felt that Donal could command more support locally than his brother as Donal's mother was an Ulster woman while Hugh Roe was the son of Finola Mac Donald, daughter of James MacDonald, Lord of Dunyveg and Kintyre, (nicknamed'Iníon Dubh/Dark-haired Daughter by the Irish) a Scottish woman. 

Shortly after the Armada shipwreck of 1588, Sir Donal O'Donnell was knighted and appointed as Sheriff of Donegal by the Lord Deputy, Sir William FitzWilliam. FitzWilliam also had Sir Eoin O'Gallagher, an influential supporter of Hugh Roe, arrested and imprisoned. In 1589 a force of Irish Army troops were sent into the area under Captain John Connill who assisted Sir Donal against his rivals.

Sir Donal grew stronger in the late 1580s, and took control over much of western Tyrconnell. He was also powerful enough to back his own candidate in the succession dispute in neighboring Fermanagh, where he established Hugh Maguire as Chief of the Name ahead of his rival Connor Roe Maguire. Donal also drew strength from his alliance with Sir Turlough Luineach O'Neill, whose daughter he had married. 

Shortly after the Armada shipwreck of 1588, Sir Donal O'Donnell was knighted and appointed as Sheriff of County Donegal by the Lord Deputy, Sir William FitzWilliam. Faced with the attempted overthrow of her husband, Sir Hugh O'Donnell, and the eclipse with English backing of her son's claim to the succession, Iníon Dubh hired large numbers of Redshank mercenaries and raised those among Donegal's Irish clans which were still loyal to her husband to confront her son's rival. Sir Donal was defeated and killed at the Battle of Doire Leathan, near Glencolmcille, on 14 September 1590.

According to the Annals of the Four Masters, "Seldom before that time had his enemies triumphed over him; and the party by whom he was slain had not been by any means his enemies until they encountered on this occasion; and although this Donnell was not the rightful heir of his father, it would have been no disgrace to Tirconnell to have elected him as its chief, had he been permitted to attain to that dignity. In this conflict were slain along with Donnell the three sons of Owen, son of Mulmurry, son of Donough above mentioned, together with two hundred others, around Donnell."<ref> [https://celt.ucc.ie//published/T100005F/index.html The Annals of the Four Masters, 1590] </ref>

Legacy
After successfully escaping from Dublin Castle two years later, Hugh Roe successfully had himself made The O'Donnell.

Sir Donal O'Donnell was survived by his only son, Donal Óg O'Donnell. In a Spanish genealogy of the O'Donnell Dukes of Tetuan, Sir Donal O'Donnell features as a collateral ancestor with the annotation "en 1589 su padre le concedio el titulo de marques - en 1587 se adhirio al pacto de su padre para librar a su hermano (Red) Hugh''".

Family tree

Notes

References

 

16th-century Irish people
People of Elizabethan Ireland
Irish knights
Year of birth unknown
1590 deaths
People from County Donegal
Donnell